Experza–Footlogix Ladies Cycling Team was a professional women's bicycle racing team based in Belgium.

The road racing team disbanded at the end of the 2018 season, although the team continues to compete in cyclocross.

Team history

2014

Riders in
On October 24 Steffy Van Den Haute, Ann-Sophie Duyck, Lenny Druyts and Nicky Degrendele signed with the team. Kaat Hannes, Saartje Vandenbroucke, Kelly Van den Steen, Eva Maria Palm, Lotte Kopecky, Jessy Druyts, Demmy Druyts, Nel De Crits, Gilke Croket and Else Belmans signed extensions with the team.

Major wins

2008
Stage 1 Omloop van Borsele, Jolien D'Hoore
Incourt, Sjoukje Dufoer
Flobecq, Sjoukje Dufoer
Chaumont-Gistoux, Loes Sels
Affligem, Sjoukje Dufoer
2009
Westkerke, Sjoukje Dufoer
Vlissegem, Katrien Van Looy
Incourt, Kelly Druyts
 Provincial Championship Waals-Brabant, Kelly Druyts
Beauraing, Kelly Druyts
Wodecq, Jolien D'Hoore
2010
 Provincial Time Trial Championship Limburg, Jessie Daams
2011
 Provincial Time Trial Championship Antwerpen, Liesbet De Vocht
Stage 4 Gracia–Orlová, Lieselot Decroix
 Provincial Road Race Championship Antwerpen, Jessy Druyts
Dwars door de Westhoek, Grace Verbeke
Stage 4 Holland Ladies Tour, Maaike Polspoel
UCI Track World Cup Cali (Scratch Race), Kelly Druyts
2012
 Provincial Time Trial Championship Antwerpen, Lotte Kopecky
 Provincial Time Trial Championship Vlaams-Brabant, Maaike Polspoel
 Provincial Road Race Championship Antwerpen, Kelly Druyts
Boortmeerbeek, Maaike Polspoel
Boortmeerbeek (Juniors), Jessy Druyts
 Provincial Road Race Championship Vlaams-Brabant, Maaike Polspoel
2014
Memorial Jacques Halleman, Kaat Hannes
Hillegem Road Race, Kelly Druyts
's Gravenwezel Road Race, Lotte Kopecky
Stage 6 Trophée d'Or Féminin, Kelly Druyts
Stage 4 Holland Ladies Tour, Kelly Druyts
Aigle Track Championships (Scratch race), Lotte Kopecky
Aigle Track Championships (Pursuit), Lotte Kopecky
Gent Track Championships (3km Pursuit), Lotte Kopecky
Gent Track Championships (Points race), Kelly Druyts
Gent Track Championships (Scratch race), Kelly Druyts
2015
Stage 1 (ITT) Auensteiner–Radsporttage, Ann-Sophie Duyck
2016
Stage 3 (ITT) Gracia–Orlová, Ann-Sophie Duyck
Ljubljana–Domžale–Ljubljana TT, Ann-Sophie Duyck
 Provincial Time Trial Championship West-Vlaanderen, Ann-Sophie Duyck
Chrono des Nations, Ann-Sophie Duyck
2017
 Provincial Time Trial Championship Antwerpen, Demmy Druyts
2018
Kasteelcross Zonnebeke, Thalita de Jong
 Provincial Time Trial Championship Antwerpen, Jessy Druyts
Stage 2 Tour de Feminin-O cenu Českého Švýcarska, Agnieszka Skalniak
Flanders Ladies Classic, Séverine Eraud

National and world champions

2008
 Belgium Cyclo-cross, Loes Sels
 World Junior Road Race, Jolien D'Hoore
 Belgium Junior  Road Race, Jolien D'Hoore
2009
 Belgium Track (Omnium), Kelly Druyts
2011
 Belgium Time Trial, Liesbet De Vocht
2012
 Belgium Road Race, Jolien D'Hoore
 Belgium Junior Time Trial, Lotte Kopecky
2013
 Belgium Track (500m Time Trial), Kelly Druyts
 Belgium Track (Points Race), Kelly Druyts
 Belgium Track (Scratch Race), Gilke Croket
 Belgium Track (Team Pursuit), Stephanie De Croock
 Belgium Track (Team Pursuit), Gilke Croket
 Belgium Track (Omnium), Else Belmans
2014
 World Track (Scratch Race), Kelly Druyts
 Belgium U23 Road Race, Lotte Kopecky
 Belgium Track (500m TT), Kelly Druyts
 Belgium Track (Scratch race), Kelly Druyts
 Belgium Track (Points race), Demmy Druyts
 Belgium Track (Pursuit), Lotte Kopecky
2015
 Belgium Time Trial, Ann-Sophie Duyck
2016
 Belgium Time Trial, Ann-Sophie Duyck
 Belgium Track (Keirin), Nicky Degrendele
 Belgium Track (Individual Sprint), Nicky Degrendele
2017
 Belgium Junior Road Race, Lotte Rotman
2018
 Belgium Track (500m time trial), Nicky Degrendele 
 Belgium Track (Keirin), Nicky Degrendele 
 Belgium U23 Time Trial, Nathalie Bex
 Belgium U23 Road Race, Nathalie Bex
 Poland U23 Time Trial, Agnieszka Skalniak

Team roster

References

UCI Women's Teams
Cycling teams based in Belgium
Cycling teams established in 2005